Akinde is a surname. Notable people with the surname include:

 Adebayo Akinde (born 1946), Nigerian academic and bishop
 Sam Akinde (born 1993), English semi-professional footballer
 John Akinde (born 1989), English professional footballer

Surnames of Nigerian origin